Warla is a village in Achham District in the Seti Zone of western Nepal. At the time of the 1991 Nepal census, the village had a population of 2469 living in 449 houses. At the time of the 2001 Nepal census, the population was 3140, of which 32% was literate.

References

Populated places in Achham District
Village development committees in Achham District